Municipal disinvestment is a term in the United States which describes an urban planning process in which a city or town or other municipal entity decides to abandon or neglect an area. It can happen when a municipality is in a period of economic prosperity and sees that its poorest and most blighted communities are both the cheapest targets for revitalization as well as the areas with the greatest potential for improvement. It is when a city is facing urban decay and chooses to allocate fewer resources to the poorest communities or communities with less political power, and disenfranchised neighborhoods are slated for demolition, relocation, and eventual replacement. Disinvestment in urban and suburban communities tends to fall strongly along racial and class lines and may perpetuate the cycle of poverty exerted upon the space, since more affluent individuals with social mobility can more easily leave disenfranchised areas.

History

The New Deal and the postwar era 
Out of the New Deal came the Public Works Administration, funding the construction of thousands of low-rent homes and infrastructure development. Meanwhile the Homeowners Refinancing Act, as well as the Wagner-Steagall Housing Act three years later, provided generous incentives and reimbursements aimed at Americans recovering from the Great Depression who could not yet afford to invest in equity. In the postwar era, returning veterans were seeking homes to start families. There was a period of intense residential expansion surrounding major US cities, and banks were gratuitously providing loans in order for families to afford moving there. It is in this new economic landscape where redlining, exclusionary zoning, and predatory lending flourished.

The programs enacted during this time provided more displacement than they did replacement: the beginning years of housing and infrastructure development were defined by their clearance and destruction of communities. The Housing Act of 1949 increased the mandate for public housing, but in claiming to combat "slums" and "blight" the act was worded so vaguely that those terms could have been applied to most any post-Depression urban neighborhood. What was intended to rebuild in decayed communities was used against poor but otherwise flourishing neighborhoods by labeling them ghettos.

The Federal Aid Highway Act of 1956 extended demolition of neighborhoods, with new roads cutting through the most vulnerable neighborhoods in order to create more direct arteries between the metropolitan and the downtown areas. The highway's construction expanded upon the already widening schism of urban poor and the suburban by further enabling white flight and reducing a focus on public transport.

Civil Rights Movement and the Great Society 
During the postwar era, municipalities sought to grow enriched and modernized communities from the slums they demolished. As the Civil Rights Movement was in full display through highway revolts and responses to racial violence, there was a growing mindset among urban planners that a communal-focused, people-first approach should be taken, along the same lines as community development handled by the recently-enacted Peace Corps. Lyndon B. Johnson continued the policies of his predecessor John F. Kennedy, and in the first year in office he signed into law the Civil Rights Act of 1964, the Voting Rights Act of 1965, and followed soon after with a series of bills that comprised the foundation of what was termed the "War on Poverty" and "Great Society", despite the protesting of a largely anti-integration Congress. The new philosophy of the administration focused intently on Community Action Agencies, fulfilling the demand from modernist social theorists and pouring funding and resources into volunteer forces. The direction of policy was seen as some as a form of direct investment in impoverished and minority neighborhoods, in contrast to the previous focus on new construction.

Daniel Patrick Moynihan served as Assistant Secretary of Labor under the Johnson Administration, and was a primary influence on policy development. Stemming from his controversial Moynihan Report, many of the programs enacted within the War on Poverty intended to educate black and poor families in order to modernize their "culture." Government assistance, in the hundreds of millions of dollars, was intended for organic community growth, nurturing local governance, and a gradual transition from developing to developed urban regions. However, when shirking programs that were directly-run by municipalities, the money was diverted to smaller, unorthodox community action associations with unions or "social protest agendas". For example, it was an Office of Economic Opportunity-funded community center where the Black Panther Party started its development.

Change in urban development policy 
Johnson responded to the radicalization of Black Americans Watts Riots by ceding control of local OEO's to municipal authorities such as the mayor (a reversal of the original strategy of community-lead development) while funding was reduced and the practices of the offices and local community projects were more closely supervised. Moynihan was startled by what he perceived as the consequences of the War on Poverty and changed his philosophy and its practice under Johnson. He found the social policies of the past decades naive for trying to fix the "tangled pathology" he described in the white paper he authored for the US Department of Labor, The Negro Family: The Case for National Action. When the administration transitioned over to Nixon, Moynihan remained as Counselor to the President, where he further pushed for dismantling the OEO. Though it continued to exist into the Reagan Administration, the OEO was put under the control of Donald Rumsfeld and Dick Cheney, who more tightly controlled its function. It is during this time that Moynihan suggests to Nixon that Black communities be treated with a "benign neglect," a philosophy-of-action which would later be translated into the planned shrinkage policies of the 70s and 80s.

Redlining

Exclusionary zoning

Benign neglect 

Benign neglect is a policy proposed in 1969 by Daniel Patrick Moynihan, who was at the time on President Richard Nixon's staff as an urban affairs adviser. While serving in this capacity, he sent the President a memo that suggested, "The time may have come when the issue of race could benefit from a period of 'benign neglect.' The subject has been too much talked about. The forum has been too much taken over to hysterics, paranoids, and boodlers on all sides. We need a period in which Negro progress continues and racial rhetoric fades." The policy was designed to ease tensions after the Civil Rights Movement of the late 1960s. Moynihan was particularly troubled by the speeches of Vice-President Spiro Agnew. However, the policy was widely seen as an abandonment of urban neighborhoods, particularly ones with a majority black population, as Moynihan's statements and writings appeared to encourage, for instance, fire departments engaging in triage to avoid a supposedly futile war against arson.

Planned shrinkage 

Planned shrinkage is a controversial public policy of the deliberate withdrawal of city services to blighted neighborhoods as a means of coping with dwindling tax revenues. Planned shrinkage involves decreasing city services such as police patrols, garbage removal, street repairs, and fire protection, from selected city neighborhoods. While it has been advocated as a way to concentrate city services for maximum effectiveness given serious budgetary constraints, it has been criticized as an attempt to "encourage the exodus of undesirable populations" as well as to open up blighted neighborhoods for development by private interests. Planned shrinkage was mentioned as a development strategy for the South Bronx section of New York City in the 1970s, and more recently for another urban area in the United States, the city of New Orleans. The term was first used in New York City in 1976 by Housing Commissioner Roger Starr. For example, in the South Bronx, many firehouses were closed from the 1960s to the 1980s. Although, firehouses were shut down all over the city during this period, by 1976 the average number of people per engine was over 44,000 in the South Bronx compared to just 17,000 in Staten Island. Firehouses in the Bronx were closed even as the fire alarm rate rose through the 60s and 70s. Many of these planning decisions can be tracked to models created by the Rand corporation.

Background 
During the twentieth century, a boom in suburban growth caused in part by increased automobile use led to urban decline, particularly in the poorer sections of many large cities in the United States and elsewhere. A dwindling tax base depleted many municipal resources. A common view was that it was part of a "downward spiral" caused first by an absence of jobs, the creation of a permanent underclass, and a declining tax base hurting many city services, including schools. It was this interplay of factors which made change difficult. New York City was described as "so broke" by the 1970s with neighborhoods which had become "so desperate and depleted" that municipal authorities wondered how to cope. Some authorities felt the process of decline was inevitable, and instead of trying to fight it, searched for alternatives. According to one view, authorities searched for ways to have the greatest population loss in the areas with the poorest non-white populations.

The RAND report 
In the early 1970s, a RAND study examining the relation between city services and large city populations concluded that when services such as police and fire protection were withdrawn, the numbers of people in the neglected areas would decrease. There had been questions about many fires that had been happening in the South Bronx during the 1970s. One account (including the RAND report) suggested that neighborhood fires were predominantly caused by arson, while a contrasting report suggested that arson was not a major cause. If arson had been a primary cause, according to the RAND viewpoint, then it did not make sense financially for the city to try to invest further funds to improve fire protection, according to this view. The RAND report allegedly influenced then Senator Daniel Patrick Moynihan, who used the report's findings to make recommendations for urban policy. In Moynihan's view, arson was one of many social pathologies caused by large cities, and suggested that a policy of benign neglect would be appropriate as a response.

Case studies

New York City 

Partly in response to the RAND report, and in an effort to address New York's declining population, New York's housing commissioner, Roger Starr, proposed a policy which he termed planned shrinkage to reduce the impoverished population and better preserve the tax base. According to the "politically toxic" proposal, the city would stop investing in troubled neighborhoods and divert funds to communities "that could still be saved." He suggested that the city should "accelerate the drainage" in what he called the worst parts of the South Bronx through a policy of planned shrinkage by closing subway stations, firehouses and schools. Starr felt these actions were the best way to save money. Starr's arguments soon became predominant in urban planning thinking nationwide. The people who lived in the communities where his policies were applied protested vigorously; without adequate fire service and police protection, the residents faced waves of crime and fires that left much of the South Bronx and Harlem devastated. A report in 2011 in the New York Times suggested that the planned shrinkage approach was "short-lived". Under the planned shrinkage program, for example, an abandoned 100-unit development on one piece of land could be cleared by a real estate developer, and such an outcome would have been preferable to ten separate neighborhood-based efforts to produce 100 housing units each, according to advocates of planned shrinkage. According to this view, a planned shrinkage approach would encourage so-called "monolithic development", resulting in new urban growth but at much lower population densities than the neighborhoods which had existed previously. The remark by Starr caused a political firestorm: then mayor Abraham Beame disavowed the idea while City Council members called it "inhuman," "racist" and "genocidal."

According to one report, the high inflation during the 1970s combined with the restrictive rent control policies in the city meant that buildings were worth more dead for the insurance money than alive as sources of rental income; as investments, they had limited ability to provide a solid stream of rental income. Accordingly, there was an economic incentive on the part of building owners, according to this view, to simply let the buildings burn. An alternative view was that the fires were a result of the city's municipal policies. While there are differing views about whether planned shrinkage caused fire outbreaks in the 1970s, or was a result of such fires, there is agreement that the fires in the South Bronx during these years were extensive.

By the mid-1970s, the Bronx had 120,000 fires per year, or an average of 30 fires every 2 hours. 40 percent of the housing in the area was destroyed. The response time for fires also increased, as the firefighters did not have the resources to keep responding promptly to numerous service calls. A report in The New York Post suggested that the cause of the fires was not arson but resulted from decisions by bureaucrats to abandon sections of the city. According to one report, of the 289 census tracts within the borough of the Bronx, seven census tracts lost more than 97% of their buildings, and 44 tracts lost more than 50% of their buildings, to fire and abandonment.

There have been claims that planned shrinkage impacted public health negatively. According to one source, public shrinkage programs targeted to undermine populations of African-Americans and Hispanic-Americans in the South Bronx and Harlem had an effect on the geographic pattern of the AIDS outbreak. According to this view, municipal abandonment was interrelated with health issues and helped to cause a phenomenon termed "urban desertification".

The populations in the South Bronx, Lower East Side, and Harlem plummeted during the two decades after 1970. Only after two decades did the city begin to invest in these areas again.

New Orleans 
New Orleans differed from other cities in that the cause of decline was not based on economic or political shifts but rather a destructive flood caused by a hurricane. In the aftermath of Hurricane Katrina, planned shrinkage was proposed as a means to create a "more compact, more efficient and less flood-prone city". Areas of the city which were most damaged by the flooding – and thus, most likely to be flooded again – would not be rebuilt and would become green space. These areas were frequently less desirable, lower-income areas which had lower property values precisely because of the risk of flooding. Some residents rejected a "top-down" approach of planned shrinkage of municipal planners and attempted to rebuild in flood-prone areas.

Detroit 

The city of Detroit, in the U.S. state of Michigan, has gone through a major economic and demographic decline in recent decades. The population of the city has fallen from a high of 1,850,000 in 1950 to 677,116 in 2015, kicking it off the top 20 of US cities by population for the first time since 1850. However, the city has a combined statistical area of 5,318,744 people, which currently ranks 12th in the United States. Local crime rates are among the highest in the United States (despite this, the overall crime rate in the city has seen a decline during the 21st century), and vast areas of the city are in a state of severe urban decay. In 2013, Detroit filed the largest municipal bankruptcy case in U.S. history, which it successfully exited on December 10, 2014. Poverty, crime, shootings, drugs and urban blight in Detroit continue to be ongoing problems.

 median household income is rising, criminal activity is decreasing by 5% annually as of 2017, and the city's blight removal project is making progress in ridding the city of all abandoned homes that cannot be rehabilitated.

Roxbury, Boston 
Planned shrinkage in Roxbury is not unique to the RAND policies enacted in the 70s and 80s. The area succumbed to numerous fires as out-of-town landlords sought out the only way to earn back some profit on homes that no longer sold. However, the neighborhood's response to planned shrinkage through community action has made it an example to other neighborhoods of the success of people-first organizing. The neighborhood had worked with the Boston's administration, but refused to give in to bureaucratic control by the city, protesting whenever the municipality neglected their redevelopment.

"Shrink to survive" 

"Shrink to survive" is a contemporary form of planned shrinkage which emphasizes short-term razing of the city: Where a city enacting planned shrinkage policies takes a Laissez-faire approach to disinvesting in its communities, cities can take an active role in that reduction. This includes investing in more aggressive land buyback and enforcement of eminent domain in order to obtain ownership of a property, relocate its residents, and demolish it. 

Such proposals, which began around 2009, entail razing entire districts within some cities or else bulldozing them to return the land to its pre-construction rural state. The policies have been studied not only by municipal and state authorities but also by the federal government, and may affect dozens of declining cities in the United States. One report suggested that 50 U.S. cities were potential candidates, and include Detroit, Philadelphia, Pittsburgh, Baltimore and Memphis. Proponents claim the plan will bring efficiency with less waste and fraud; detractors complain the policy has been a "disaster" and advocate for community-based efforts instead.

Flint 
Shrink to survive was initiated by Dan Kildee during his term as Treasurer of Genesee County, Michigan. He proposed it as a way to handle municipal problems in Flint, which had experienced an exodus of people and business during the automobile industry downturn. Flint had been described as one of the poorest Rust Belt cities. One estimate was that its population had declined by half since 1950. In 2002, authorities established a "municipal land bank" to buy abandoned or foreclosed homes to prevent them from being bought up by real estate speculators. One report was that by the summer of 2009, 1,100 homes in Flint had been bulldozed and that another 3,000 had been scheduled for demolition. One estimate was that the city's size would shrink by twenty per cent, while a second estimate was that it needed to contract by 40% to once again become viable financially.

Shrink to survive in other cities 
Shrink to survive has been enacted in other medium-sized cities in the American Rust belt such as the Michigan city Benton Harbor, as well as the Ohio city of Youngstown. One report suggested that city authorities in Youngstown had demolished 2,000 derelict homes and businesses. In addition, shrink-to-survive has been considered for inner city suburbs of Detroit.

Municipal authorities in Gary, Indiana are considering plans to shrink the city by 40%, possibly by demolition or possibly by letting Nature overgrow abandoned buildings, as a way to raise values for existing structures, reduce crime, and restore the city to fiscal health. The city has suffered a sustained decline in job losses and a consequent housing bust.

See also 
 South Bronx
 Urban decay
 Gentrification
 Mortgage Discrimination
 Redlining
 Urban renewal
 Principles of Intelligent Urbanism
 Austerity
 Environmental racism
 Ghost town

References

Further reading 
 The City Journal: Roger Starr 1918–2001 by Myron Magnet; Roger Starr had been editor of City Journal
 In the South Bronx of America by Mel Rosenthal, Martha Rosler and Barry Phillips
 South Bronx Rising: The Rise, fall and resurrection of an American city by Jill Jones

External links 

 Housing Policy Debate: Planned Abandonment: The Neighborhood Life-Cycle Theory and National Urban Policy by John T. Metzger
 Themis: There Goes the Neighborhood: Exposing the Relationship Between Gentrification and Incarceration by Casey Kellogg
 Disinvestment and Planned Shrinkage: Clearing the Way for Redevelopment of the Lower East Side gregoryheller.com
 New Hope in the Bronx startsandfits.com
 Syndemic Preventions Network article quoting from the Wallaces' work about AIDS and the South Bronx retrieved from Web Archive on July 6, 2008
 Video: Deborah Wallace of the Harlem Tenants Council Conference on Gentrification, June 2, 2007, Harlem, NY

History of New York City
History of the Bronx
Urban planning in the United States
Urban decay
Urban politics in the United States
Flint, Michigan